Vaiatu may refer to several places in Estonia:
Vaiatu, Jõgeva County, village in Estonia
Vaiatu, Lääne-Viru County, village in Estonia